25th CDG Awards
February 27, 2023

Contemporary:
Glass Onion: A Knives Out Mystery

Period:
Elvis

Sci-Fi/Fantasy:
Everything Everywhere All at Once

The 25th Costume Designers Guild Awards, honoring excellence in film, television, and short form costume design for 2022, were held on February 27, 2023, at the Fairmont Century Plaza in Los Angeles. The nominees were announced on January 12, 2023. The ceremony was hosted by Tituss Burgess. Special honors were awarded to Angela Bassett (Spotlight Award), Bette Midler (Distinguished Collaborator Award), and costume designers Deborah L. Scott (Career Achievement Award) and Rachael M. Stanley (Distinguished Service Award).

Winners and nominees
Winners are listed first and in bold.

Film

Television

Short Form

References

External links
 Official website

Costume Designers Guild Awards
2022 film awards
2022 television awards
2022 in American cinema
2022 in American television
2022 in fashion